Federated Women's Club State Forest is a Massachusetts state forest located in the towns of Petersham and New Salem. Notable forest scenery is found along wooded roads with views of Fever Brook, which has been dammed and provides a stopover for migrating birds. The forest's most prominent geological feature, "The Gorge," is found in the southwest part of the property. The forest is managed by the Department of Conservation and Recreation (DCR).

Activities and amenities
Camping: There are a limited number of primitive campsites which are first-come, first-served. Registration is at Erving State Forest.
Trails are used for hiking and cross-country skiing.
The forest also offers fishing and restricted hunting.

References

External links 
Federated Women's Club State Forest Department of Conservation and Recreation
Campground Map Department of Conservation and Recreation

Massachusetts state forests
Protected areas of Worcester County, Massachusetts
State parks of Massachusetts
Petersham, Massachusetts